Triptych is a 2006 thriller novel by American author Karin Slaughter. The first in her Atlanta series, the novel centers on Will Trent of the Georgia Bureau of Investigation, and features Angie Polaski. The audiobook is narrated by Michael Kramer.

Plot summary 
Will Trent of the Georgia Bureau of Investigation is on the trail of a serial rapist with a gruesome inclination, when he comes into contact with Michael Ormewood, an Atlanta homicide detective. Ormewood has a dark past and it involves Angie Polaski, a vice cop who is the only woman Will has ever loved. John Shelley, who at fifteen was tried as an adult for the rape and murder of a neighbor girl, has just gotten out of  prison after twenty years. John's trying to stay clean and keep his parole officer happy when he discovers by accident that he's involved with the rapist, and if John doesn't take action fast, he will end up back in prison. Will and Michael work to solve the case, mingling with the pimps and sex workers of Atlanta's housing projects in search of clues. Will and Angie resume their strange relationship after a two-year hiatus. Will continues his struggle to keep anyone from finding out about his dyslexia, a definite career-ender, and Will's job is the only thing that keeps the painful demons of his own past at bay.

References

External links 
 Karin Slaughter official website

2006 American novels
American thriller novels
Novels set in Atlanta
Delacorte Press books